Ian Chandler may refer to:

 Ian Chandler (footballer) (born 1968), English former footballer
 Ian Chandler (priest) (born 1965), Archdeacon of Plymouth
 Ian Chandler (cyclist) (born 1951), Australian cyclist